Sopot is a small river in Poland. It originates near the Majdan Sopocki village and flows through Roztocze hills, passing through villages of Ciotusza Stara, Nowiny, Hamernia, and Osuchy. It is a tributary of Tanew.

The river flows through the Polish Landscape Park of Puszcza Solska and the Czartowe Pole nature preserve.

Rivers of Poland
Rivers of Lublin Voivodeship